Route 95 is a  provincial highway in New Brunswick, which connects Interstate 95 (I-95) at the Houlton–Woodstock Border Crossing near Houlton, Maine, United States to New Brunswick Route 2 (the Trans-Canada Highway) in Woodstock, New Brunswick, Canada.

Prior to the construction of Route 95, the connection between the two cities was served by Route 5. In 2007 the New Brunswick government completed a roadworks project to turn Route 95 into a full freeway for its entire length.

Route description
Route 95 begins at the Houlton–Woodstock Border Crossing on the Maine–New Brunswick border as an extension of I-95. The border between the two countries also marks the border between the Eastern Time Zone and the Atlantic Time Zone. The highway travels northeast through woodlands as it approaches its first interchange with Route 540 via a hybrid diamond interchange/partial cloverleaf interchange, providing access to the towns of Richmond Corner and Belleville. Continuing east, the highway crosses over Plymouth Road before intersecting an eastbound exit for Vivglenn Road, which connects to Route 555. The final exit on the highway is a trumpet interchange with Route 2, which is the main route of the Trans-Canada Highway through the province, in Woodstock.

History 
A road linking Houlton to Woodstock has existed since at least 1927, and was numbered Route 5 between 1938 and 1951. The current Route 95 was constructed in the late 1970s and numbered Route 95 by 1981.  By 1989, the intersection between Route 95 and Route 2 was converted into an interchange. In 2007, the New Brunswick Department of Transportation completed a 33 million construction project, turning Route 95 from a two-lane undivided highway to a grade-separated four lane freeway. The Province has contracted with Brun-Way Highway Operations to provide maintenance for the highway until 2023.

Exit list

References

External links 

Route 95 / Route 540 traffic camera

095
095
Woodstock, New Brunswick